Sarah Greenwood (née Field;   13 December 1889) was a New Zealand artist, letter-writer and teacher.

Biography
She was born in Lambeth, Surrey, England, in about 1809. Her letters and drawings of her experiences depict pioneer life in Nelson, New Zealand, where she lived for 46 years. Her early education included the study of drawing, music, and languages. However, it is not known from where or whom she received her training in art. Her work and technique suggests that she did not draw from life and may have been taught by a lithographer.

In the 1850s, Greenwood became involved in political and academic interests in Nelson and Wellington. She also ran a successful school on Bridge Street between 1865 and 1868 with six of her daughters. 
Sarah retired to Motueka in 1877 and lived with her son on the Grange.

Greenwood died in Motueka on 13 December 1889, aged 80.

References

1809 births
1889 deaths
People from Lambeth
New Zealand writers
English emigrants to New Zealand
19th-century New Zealand artists
19th-century New Zealand women artists
19th-century New Zealand educators